Geoff Kerr (7 April 1925 – 26 May 2020) was an Australian rules footballer who played with St Kilda in the Victorian Football League (VFL). He died in May 2020 at the age of 95.

Notes

External links 
		

1925 births
2020 deaths
Australian rules footballers from Victoria (Australia)
St Kilda Football Club players